Viḷḷatresmil is one of 44 parishes (administrative divisions) in Tineo, a municipality within the province and autonomous community of Asturias, in northern Spain.

Villages 
 Busteḷḷán
 Busturniegu
 Las Cruces
 Folgueirúa
 Las Tabiernas
 Viḷḷatresmil

References

Parishes in Tineo